Songsoptok (Shôngshôptôk) is a drama serial which aired on Bangladesh Television. It was first filmed in the year 1971, but filming was stopped after just four episodes as the liberation war started in March. After many years, filming restarted in 1988; but it was put on hold yet again after the widespread floods started. Filming was resumed after the floods ceased. It is based on the novel of the same name by Shahidullah Kaiser.

Various actors starred in the drama, including Humayun Faridi.

Plot overview
The drama depicts the lives and struggles of the inhabitants of a village called Bakulia during the British Raj. The village has two influential but feuding families, the Miyas and the Syeds.

Cast
 Humayun Faridi as Ramzan
 Ferdousi Mazumder as Hurmoti
 Suborna Mustafa as Rabu
 Mamunur Rashid as Sekandor Master
Khalil Ullah Khan as Felu Mia
Tarin Jahan as Rasu
Tariq Anam Khan as Mejo Syed

References

1990s Bangladeshi drama television series
Bangladeshi drama television series
Bangladeshi literature
Bengali-language television programming in Bangladesh
Bangladesh Television original programming